The 2018 SaarLorLux Open was a badminton tournament that took place at Saarlandhalle in Saarbrücken, Germany, from 30 October to 4 November 2018 and had a total prize of $75,000.

Tournament
The 2018 SaarLorLux Open was the tenth Super 100 tournament of the 2018 BWF World Tour and also part of the SaarLorLux Open championships, which had been held since 1988. This tournament was organized by German Badminton Association and sanctioned by the BWF.

Venue
This international tournament was held at Saarlandhalle in Saarbrücken, Saarland, Germany.

Point distribution
Below is the point distribution table for each phase of the tournament based on the BWF points system for the BWF Tour Super 100 event.

Prize money
The total prize money for this year's tournament was US$75,000. Distribution of prize money was in accordance with BWF regulations.

Men's singles

Seeds

 Lin Dan (third round)
 Rasmus Gemke (withdrew)
 Mark Caljouw (quarter-finals)
 Jan Ø. Jørgensen (withdrew)
 Rajiv Ouseph (final)
 Lucas Corvée (third round)
 Toby Penty (quarter-finals)
 Parupalli Kashyap (quarter-finals)

Finals

Top half

Section 1

Section 2

Bottom half

Section 3

Section 4

Women's singles

Seeds

 Gao Fangjie (semi-finals)
 Gregoria Mariska Tunjung (withdrew)
 Cai Yanyan (champion)
 Chen Xiaoxin (final)
 Line Kjærsfeldt (semi-finals)
 Beatriz Corrales (first round)
 Fitriani (quarter-finals)
 Linda Zetchiri (second round)

Finals

Top half

Section 1

Section 2

Bottom half

Section 3

Section 4

Men's doubles

Seeds

 Aaron Chia / Soh Wooi Yik (final)
 Jelle Maas / Robin Tabeling (semi-finals)
 Marcus Ellis / Chris Langridge (champions)
 Mark Lamsfuß / Marvin Emil Seidel (quarter-finals)

Finals

Top half

Section 1

Section 2

Bottom half

Section 3

Section 4

Women's doubles

Seeds

 Gabriela Stoeva / Stefani Stoeva (champions)
 Delphine Delrue / Léa Palermo (second round)
 Johanna Goliszewski / Lara Käpplein (quarter-finals)
 Anastasia Chervyakova / Olga Morozova (quarter-finals)

Finals

Top half

Section 1

Section 2

Bottom half

Section 3

Section 4

Mixed doubles

Seeds

 Marcus Ellis / Lauren Smith (champions)
 Mark Lamsfuß / Isabel Herttrich (quarter-finals)
 Jacco Arends / Selena Piek (withdrew)
 Marvin Emil Seidel / Linda Efler (semi-finals)
 Lu Kai / Chen Lu (final)
 Robin Tabeling / Cheryl Seinen (first round)
 Sam Magee / Chloe Magee (quarter-finals)
 Ren Xiangyu /  Zhou Chaomin (withdrew)

Finals

Top half

Section 1

Section 2

Bottom half

Section 3

Section 4

References

External links
 Tournament Link

SaarLorLux Open
SaarLorLux Open
SaarLorLux Open
SaarLorLux Open
SaarLorLux Open